A set is artificially constructed scenery used in theatre, film and TV. In the latter two cases there are many reasons to build or use a set instead of travelling to a real location, such as budget, time, the need to control the environment, or the fact that the place does not exist. Sets are normally constructed on a film studio backlot or sound stage, but any place that has been modified to give the feel of another place is a set.

Gallery

See also
 Location shooting
 Theatrical scenery
 Set construction

References 

Film and video terminology
Scenic design